The Konzertmusik for String Orchestra and Brass, Op. 50, is a work by Paul Hindemith, composed in 1930.  It was one of a large group of pieces commissioned for the 50th anniversary of the Boston Symphony Orchestra by its music director, Serge Koussevitzky (others include the Piano Concerto in G major by Maurice Ravel, the Symphony of Psalms by Igor Stravinsky, and Aaron Copland's Symphonic Ode).  Koussevitzky conducted the premiere of Hindemith's work with the Boston Symphony Orchestra on 3 April 1931.

This was the last of three 1930 scores that Hindemith designated "Konzertmusik" (which may be translated as "Concert Music"): the others were the Konzertmusik for Viola and Chamber Orchestra, Op. 48, and the Konzertmusik for Piano, Brass and Harp, Op. 49.  Hindemith never used for the designation for any subsequent work, and the Konzertmusik for String Orchestra and Brass was the last piece to which he assigned an opus number.

Some twenty minutes in duration, Hindemith's score is cast in two movements, each divided into several sections:

I. Mässig schnell, mit Kraft – Sehr breit, aber stets fließend (Moderately fast, with power – Very broad, but always flowing)

II. Lebhaft – Langsam – Im ersten Zeitmaß (Fast – Slow – Tempo primo)

Instrumentation 
The score of this work calls for 4 French horns in F, 4 trumpets in C, 3 trombones, bass tuba and a four-section string orchestra of violins, violas, cellos and double basses.

External links
Konzertmusik für Streichorchester und Blechbläser op. 50, hindemith.info

Compositions by Paul Hindemith
1930 compositions